Achilles James Daunt  (born 18 October 1963) is a British businessman. He is the founder of the Daunt Books chain, and since May 2011 has been managing director of the bookshop chain Waterstones. Since August 2019, Daunt has also been CEO of Barnes & Noble, the American bookstore chain. He is known as "the man who saved Waterstones".

Early life and education
Achilles James Daunt was born on 18 October 1963, the son of the diplomat Sir Timothy Daunt and his wife Patricia Susan Knight.

He was educated at Sherborne School, before reading history at Pembroke College, Cambridge University.

Career
His first job was as a purser with Carnival Cruise Lines.

After working in the US as a banker for JP Morgan between 1985 and 1988, he founded Daunt Books in 1990, a chain of six bookshops in London.

In May 2011, he was appointed managing director of Waterstones by the company's new owner, the Russian billionaire Alexander Mamut. The pair were listed at fourth place in a 2011 Guardian list of the top 100 people in the British books industry.

Daunt was elected an Honorary Fellow of the Royal Society of Literature in 2017.

In June 2019, he became the CEO of the US bookshop chain Barnes & Noble, acquired by Waterstones' parent, Elliott Advisors (UK) for $683m.

Daunt was appointed Commander of the Order of the British Empire (CBE) in the 2022 Birthday Honours for services to publishing.

Personal life

He is married to Katy Steward, a professional in the health sector. They have two daughters, Molly and Eliza, and live in a 4-storey house in Hampstead. They have a second house in Beccles, Suffolk, and a third on the Isle of Jura in Scotland.

References

1963 births
Living people
Alumni of Pembroke College, Cambridge
James
English booksellers
People educated at Sherborne School
Fellows of the Royal Society of Literature
20th-century English businesspeople
21st-century English businesspeople
Commanders of the Order of the British Empire